Kai Pflaume (born 27 May 1967 in Halle) is a German television presenter and game show host.

Biography 
Pflaume presented the television show Nur die Liebe zählt from 1993 to 2011. Different TV shows on broadcaster SAT1 followed since 1993, for example Die Glücksspirale, Rache ist süß, Die Comedy-Falle, Stars am Limit, Die LEGO Show, Träume werden wahr, Deutschland hilft - Spenden für die Opfer der Flutkatastrophe or Die Chance deines Lebens. 

In August 1996, Pflaume married his wife Ilke. The couple has two sons. He once worked at a bank in Germany, where he eventually was called for casting in a television show.

TV filmography 

 Nur die Liebe zählt
 Die Glücksspirale
 Rache ist süß
 Die Comedy-Falle
 Stars am Limit
 Die LEGO Show
 Träume werden wahr
 Deutschland hilft - Spenden für die Opfer der Flutkatastrophe
 Die Chance deines Lebens
 Rich List
 Das Starquiz mit Kai Pflaume
 Dalli Dalli
 Drei bei Kai
 Der klügste Deutsche 2011
 Wer weiß denn sowas?

Awards 

 1993: Bambi Award
 2014: Bavarian TV Award

External links 

1967 births
Living people
People from Halle (Saale)
People from Bezirk Halle
German game show hosts
RTL Group people
ARD (broadcaster) people
Sat.1 people